The 2022 10m European Shooting Championships was held from 18 to 27 March 2022 in Hamar, Norway.

Medals

Seniors and Juniors (20-27 March)

Para Events (15-18 March)
https://www.em2022.no/medaljeoversikter/

Participating issue
Because of Russian invasion of Ukraine, Russia and Belarus were banned, and Ukrainian athletes could not attend due to the war in their country.

Results

Seniors

Men

Women

Mixed events

Juniors

Men

Women

Mixed events

References

External links
Official site
https://esc-shooting.org/storage/2022/03/30/6c94db16619bf5b2b44ce563331cf68dc471c55f.pdf

European Shooting Championships
European Shooting Championships
International sports competitions hosted by Norway
European 10 m Events Championships
Sport in Hamar
European Shooting Championships